Kissing a Fool is a 1998 American romantic comedy film directed by Doug Ellin. It primarily stars David Schwimmer, Jason Lee, Mili Avital, Kari Wührer, and Vanessa Angel. Schwimmer was one of the executive producers.

Plot
Max (David Schwimmer), an alpha-male commitment-phobic sports broadcaster, and Jay (Jason Lee), a neurotic novelist, have been best friends since childhood in Chicago. Jay has just broken up with his girlfriend, Natasha (Vanessa Angel) and is writing his first book about their relationship in Milan, Italy. He is melancholy and has been drinking. 

Jay sets Max up with his editor Samantha (Mili Avital). After their first date, they each tell him in detail how terrible it was, he tells it like she was a loud and obnoxious drunk, while she claims he brought her to a strip club. Convinced they've fooled him, they make out, then burst out laughing.

Although they share few interests, they are engaged within two weeks, and shortly thereafter he moves in. Flipping through bridal magazines, a photo of Jay's model ex Natasha upsets him, so he later drunk-calls her.

Still, when Max is confronted with the fact that Sam will be the last woman he will sleep with in a dream, he proposes a test. Jay will hit on Sam, if she shows no interest, then Max will be confident enough in her loyalty to go ahead with the marriage.

However Jay really doesn't want to, he gets really nervous and goes from proposing to stop meetings with Sam to meeting several times a week. The publisher pushes up their completion date to six weeks, forcing them to be together constantly.

Two weeks before the three plan to have a celebratory dinner for the book's conclusion, but Max has to go to Detroit for work. So, Jay and Sam go out drinking and dancing, he bumps into Natasha and Sam pretends she is his new fiancée.

Later, Jay crashes at Sam's, and after finishing reading the manuscript, she goes upstairs to talk to him, and before they have a moment, her cousin Dre interrupts them. He goes home, where his ex has invited him to her hotel room.

At Natasha's hotel room. she tears Jay's clothes off as having seen him with Sam has rekindled her interest. He realizes he is finally over her. Feeling guilty at the sudden revelation of his feelings for Sam, he calls Max and realizes he slept with his makeup artist.

Jay rushes over to Sam's but then chickens out. He goes home, hitting the bottle hard. Max finds him there, confronting him over Sam. After an altercation, they agree to go to her to see which she wants.

Over a meal, Jay declares his love for Sam and kisses her. Max thinks it's a joke, spilling the beans about the fidelity test he'd asked Jay to do on her. Upset, she leaves, breaking off ties with both.

Jay moves to NYC, Max finally reads the book he'd recommended and realizes he needs to reunite Jay and Sam. When he is in Chicago for his book signing, he leaves him a note, asking him to meet him in a restaurant. He enlists Dre to get Sam there. Once seated, he has notes delivered to both of them.

In the closing scene, Max gives them his blessing at their wedding. When there, Jay and Sam dance together as do Max and Linda, implying a relationship between the two of them.

Cast

David Schwimmer – Max Abbitt
Jason Lee – Jay Murphy
Mili Avital – Samantha Andrews
Bonnie Hunt – Linda Streicher
Kari Wührer – Dara
Vanessa Angel – Natasha
Bitty Schram – Vicki Pelam
Judy Greer – Andrea or 'Dre'
Frank Medrano – Cliff Randal
Ron Beattie – Priest
Doug Ellin – Bartender (and Springer Guest)
Tag Mendillo – Wedding Guest at Bar (and Springer Guest)
Justine Bentley – Beautiful Woman at Bar
Liza Cruzat – Dara's Friend
Jessica Mills – Dara's Friend #2
Sammy Sosa – Himself
Jerry Springer – Himself
Mike Squire – Spanish Man in Bed
Marco Siviero – French Man in Bed
Steve Seagren – Heckler
Philip R. Smith – Fan on the Street
Jayson Fate – Rudolpho
Ross Bon – Blue Kings Lead Singer
Antimo Fiore – Tony

Production
In July 1997, Mili Avital was cast.

Reception
Kissing a Fool received mostly negative reviews from critics, earning a 29% rating on Rotten Tomatoes, based on 31 reviews.

Box office
The movie did not make as much profit as expected. The film's budget was US$19 million and the box office took in just US$4.107 million.

Soundtrack
The Original Motion Picture Soundtrack was released on March 24, 1998, with music composed by Joseph Vitarelli.

Track listing
"Baby Drives Me Wild" – The Mighty Blue Kings
"Leaving Town"
"The Girl Who Is"
"The Green Mill" – The Mighty Blue Kings
"Spark Of My Life" – The Mighty Blue Kings
"Here She Comes"
"Visiting Natassia"
"Bad Date"
"Grinnin' Like A Chessy Cat" – The Mighty Blue Kings
"Pure Rental"
"Jay Alone"
"Martinis"
"The Toast"
"At Last" – Etta James

Other notable songs not featured in the soundtrack include:

 "We Are In Love" – Harry Connick, Jr.
 "Ready For Love" – Bad Company
 "All Out Of Love" – Air Supply
 "Learn To Love" – Harry Connick, Jr.
 "Last" – Gravity Kills
 "Crazy" – Cordrazine
 "Be Your Own" – Rebekah

Locations
Filmed in Chicago, Illinois, Kissing A Fool utilises several locations within the area. Amongst them are:
Lincoln Park Zoo
The Green Mill Jazz Club
Wrigley Field
Outside the Seventeenth Church of Christ Scientist building
Ambria Restaurant at 2300 N. Lincoln Park W., which closed in June 2007
Lake Bluff's bluff was used as the back drop for the film's wedding scenes

References

External links

1998 films
1998 romantic comedy films
American romantic comedy films
Largo Entertainment films
Films set in Chicago
Films directed by Doug Ellin
Films produced by Andrew Form
1990s English-language films
1990s American films